Carmenta flaschkai is a moth of the family Sesiidae. It was described by Eichlin in 1993. It is known from North America, including Texas.

References

Sesiidae
Moths described in 1993